WSKP may refer to:

 WSKP (AM), a radio station (1180 AM) licensed to Hope Valley, Rhode Island, United States
 WWRX (FM), a radio station (107.7 FM) licensed to Ledyard, Connecticut, United States, which used the call sign WSKP from 2013 to 2014
 WMFM, a radio station (107.9 FM) licensed to Key West, Florida, United States, which used the call sign WSKP from 1993 to 1997
 WWLL, a radio station (105.7 FM) licensed to Sebring, Florida, United States, which used the call signs WSKP and WSKP-FM from 1978 to 1984